Fitzroy Street may refer to:

Fitzrovia, a district of London including Fitzroy Street
Fitzroy Street, Melbourne
Fitzroy Street Group